Sangaris multimaculata is a species of beetle in the family Cerambycidae. It was described by Hovore in 1998. It is known from Costa Rica and Honduras.

References

multimaculata
Beetles described in 1998